Varney Samuel "Varn" Anderson ( – ) was a Major League Baseball pitcher who played for the Indianapolis Hoosiers and the Washington Senators.

Professional career

Early minor league years
Anderson played professionally at least as early as 1887 for the minor league Milwaukee Brewers. He split the  season between the Minneapolis Millers and St. Paul Apostles of the Western Association.

Indianapolis Hoosiers
At the age of 23 years Anderson broke into the major leagues with the Indianapolis Hoosiers. In just one season, Anderson pitched just two games going 0–1 with three strikeouts with a 4.50 ERA in 12 innings pitched.

Washington Senators
In  Anderson played and managed the non-affiliated Burlington Hawkeyes. For the next three seasons there is no record of Anderson playing for any major league or minor league team. He finally joined the Washington Senators where in his first year, Anderson went 0–2 with three strikeouts and a 7.07 ERA in 14 innings pitched.

The next season, Anderson was used considerably more. He was primarily a starting pitcher but did make a few relief appearances. In 29 games, 25 starts, Anderson went 9–16 with 35 strikeouts, 18 complete games and a 5.86 ERA in 204 innings pitched.

Anderson went 0–1 with a 13.00 ERA in only two games with nine innings pitched.

External links

Career statistics and bio at Baseball Almanac.

Major League Baseball pitchers
Indianapolis Hoosiers (NL) players
Washington Senators (1891–1899) players
Baseball players from Illinois
1866 births
1941 deaths
19th-century baseball players
Minor league baseball managers
Milwaukee Cream Citys players
Oakland Greenhood & Morans players
Minneapolis Millers (baseball) players
St. Paul Apostles players
Detroit Wolverines (minor league) players
Burlington Babies players
Ottumwa (minor league baseball) players
Burlington Hawkeyes players
Charleston Seagulls players
Lynchburg Hill Climbers players
Mobile Bluebirds players
Atlanta (minor league baseball) players
Rockford Forest Citys players
Rock Island (minor league baseball) players
Sterling (minor league baseball) players
Galesburg (minor league baseball) players
Burlington (minor league baseball) players
People from Geneva, Illinois
Rock Island Islanders players